St. Lorenzen is a comune (municipality) in South Tyrol in northern Italy, located about  northeast of Bolzano.

St Lorenzen borders the following municipalities: Bruneck, Kiens, Pfalzen, Lüsen, Mareo, and Rodeneck.

Geography

The municipality of St Lorenzen contains the frazioni (subdivisions, mainly villages and hamlets) Ellen (Elle), Fassing (Fassine), Runggen (Ronchi), Montal (Mantana), Pflaurenz (Floronzo), Saalen (Sares), Sonnenburg (Castelbadia), Stefansdorf (Sante Stefano), St Martin (San Martino), Moos (Palù), Lothen, and Onach.

St Lorenzen borders the following municipalities: Bruneck, Kiens, Pfalzen, Lüsen, Mareo, and Rodeneck.

History

Coat of arms
The emblem represents Saint Laurence, with a vert palm in his right hand and a grill on the left, on argent. The emblem is used by the 17th century, but appears in the seal since 1271.

Society

Linguistic distribution
According to the 2011 census, 95.31% of the population speak German, 2.64% Italian and 1.34% Ladin as first language.

Demographic evolution

Culture

Notable people
 Jakob Hutter

References

External links

 Homepage of the municipality

Municipalities of South Tyrol